Shebandowan is an unincorporated community in the Canadian province of Ontario, located on Highway 11 in the Thunder Bay District.

The community is administered by a local services board, and is counted as part of the Unorganized Thunder Bay District in Canadian census data. Home of the Shebandowan Natives Golden Hockey League team.

Communities in Thunder Bay District
Local services boards in Ontario